Susanne Scholl (born 19 September 1949) is an Austrian journalist, writer and doyenne of the foreign correspondents of the ORF.

Life and career 

Born in Vienna, Scholl is the daughter of an assimilated Austrian-Jewish medical family, whose tragic fate she dealt with in her novel Elsa's Grandfathers. They had met at the "Austrian Center" in emigration in London, and returned to Vienna in 1947 to help build communism in Austria.

Scholl embarked on her educational path with doctoral studies in Slavic Studies in Russia and Rome, which she completed in Rome in 1972. Journalistically, she worked for Radio Österreich International (ROI) and the Austria Press Agency, from where she was recruited by Paul Lendvai in 1986 to the pioneering team of the new ORF Eastern Europe editorial department.

In 1989, Scholl went to Bonn as a correspondent for the ORF, and in 1991 she moved to Moscow. From 1997 to 2000, she headed the Europajournal on ORF radio at the Vienna headquarters, before returning to Moscow. Her temporary arrest by the Russian authorities while reporting from Chechnya caused a sensation.

The mother of a pair of twins born in 1983 has emerged as a book author - Russian Diary, Moscow Kitchen Talks, Elsa's Grandfathers (novel), Natasha's Winter (stories), Journey to Karaganda (novel), Daughters of War - Survival in Chechnya, Red as Love (poems), Russia with and without a Soul, Russian Winter Journey (poems), Alone at Home, The Queen of Sheba (short story), Waking Dream (novel).

Together with Monika Salzer, she founded the platform Omas gegen Rechts.

The author  was her grandfather.

Publications 
 Russisches Tagebuch
 Moskauer Küchengespräche.
 Elsas Großväter (novel),
 Nataschas Winter (tales)
 Reise nach Karaganda (novel)
 Töchter des Krieges – Überleben in Tschetschenien
 Rot wie die Liebe (poems)
 Russland mit und ohne Seele
 Russische Winterreise (tales)
 Allein zu Hause
 Die Königin von Saba (tales)
 Emma schweigt. , 2014, .
 Warten auf Gianni (novel). Residenz Verlag, 2016, .
 Wachtraum (novel), Residenz Verlag, 2017, .
 Die Damen des Hauses, Residenz Verlag, 2019, .

Awards 
Scholl was awarded the Austrian Decoration for Science and Art and numerous prizes, such as the Axel Corti Prize of the Austrian National Education in 2007 and the Concordia Prize of the Presseclub Concordia. In 2009 she was Journalist of the Year in the category Foreign Policy. In 2012, she was awarded the  Lifetime Award. On 29 October 2020, she was awarded the 2020 Ferdinand Berger Prize by the Austrian Documentation Archive at Vienna City Hall.

References

External links 

 

Austrian women television presenters
Recipients of the Austrian Cross of Honour for Science and Art
1949 births
Living people
Writers from Vienna